This is a list of aircraft produced by Kamov, a Russian aircraft manufacturer.

Designs

KaSkr-I Gyrocraft 1929 25 September 1929, the first Soviet autogyro, designed by Kamov and Skrzhinskii. Based on Cierva models named The Red Engineer. 
KaSkr-II Gyrocraft 1930 Re-engined KASKR-I with a Gnome-Rhone Titan engine.
Kamov A-7 1934 An autogyro primarily used for observation duties.
Ka-8 Irkutyanin 1947 single seat helicopter
Ka-9
Ka-10 1950 Single-seat observation helicopter. NATO reporting name Hat.
Ka-11 small single-seat helicopter
Ka-12 multi-purpose nine-seat helicopter
Ka-14 light multipurpose helicopter
Ka-15 1952 Two-seat utility helicopter. Nato reporting name Hen.
Ka-18 1955 A Ka-15 with a large fuselage and a 280 hp Ivchenko AI-14VF engine. Could carry 4 passengers. 200 units built (approximately). NATO reporting name Hog.
Ka-20 1958 Twin-engine antisubmarine helicopter prototype. NATO reporting name Harp.
Ka-22 Vintokryl 1959 Experimental rotor-winged transport aircraft. NATO reporting name Hoop.
Ka-25 1961 Naval helicopter. NATO reporting name Hormone.
Ka-26 1965 Light utility helicopter. NATO reporting name Hoodlum.
Ka-27 1974 Anti-submarine helicopter. NATO reporting name Helix.
Ka-28 export version of Ka-27 Helix
Ka-29 assault transport version of the Ka-27 Helix
Ka-31 airborne early warning helicopter
Ka-32 civilian version of the Ka-27 Helix
Ka-34 heavy rotary-wing aircraft
Ka-35 heavy jet-powered rotary-wing aircraft
Ka-37 1993 An unmanned coaxial helicopter developed with Daewoo of South Korea initially designed for agricultural tasks. Performances are a max weight of 250 kg ( 50 payload ), speed of 110 km/h, and a flight duration about 45 minutes.
Ka-40 1990s? anti-submarine helicopter (Replacement for the Ka-27. In development)
Ka-50 "Black Shark" 1982 Single-seat attack helicopter. NATO reporting name Hokum.
Ka-52 "Alligator" 1997 two seat attack helicopter and widely used model
Ka-56 ultralight helicopter for special forces
Ka-60 Kasatka 1990s Transport/utility helicopter
Ka-62 1990s civilian transport and utility helicopter
Ka-64 Sky Horse 1990s naval transport and utility helicopter
Ka-90 High-speed helicopter project.
Ka-92 passenger helicopter
Ka-115 Moskvichka 1990s light multi-purpose helicopter
Ka-118 1980s-1990s A NOTAR development - light multirole helicopter
Ka-126 1980s Light utility helicopter. NATO reporting name Hoodlum-B.
Ka-128 light utility helicopter (one prototype only)
Ka-137 1990s Unmanned drone/unmanned multipurpose helicopter
Ka-226 "Sergei" 1990s small, twin-engined utility helicopter
V-50 1960s A high-speed assault helicopter project with tandem rotors. Cancelled.
V-60 1980s A light scout and escort helicopter
V-80 1970s A series of design studies for an attack helicopter (culminating in the Ka-50)
V-100 1980s Twin-rotor combat helicopter project

Kamov